Industrifonden is one of the larger venture capital firms in the Nordics, backing growth companies in the Technology or Life Science sectors. The head office is in Stockholm, where the team of 30 professionals are located.

History 
Industrifonden was founded by the Swedish government in 1979 to promote industrial development in Sweden and finance larger industry projects. In 1996, the focus was changed, and Industrifonden was given the ability to enter as an investor in small and medium-sized companies through venture capital investments. (Förordning (1996:880) om finansiering genom stiftelsen Industrifonden). The Swedish government's total capital contribution in Industrifonden amounts to 1.6 billion SEK.

Investments 
Industrifonden invests in companies in the Technology and Life Science sectors. The investor is an independent evergreen venture capital fund, and the fund has more than doubled in size since its inception, following profitable exits. The investor is actively involved in the portfolio companies, contributing not only with capital but also expertise and a broad network of resources.

Portfolio 
Selected companies that Industrifonden has invested in:

Technology 
 Barnebys
 Fishbrain
 Footway
 InRiver
 Qapital
 Widespace
DPOrganizer

Life Science 
 AMRA
 Airsonett
 BONESUPPORT
 Smartfish
Oatly

References

External links 
 Industrifonden

Venture capital firms of Sweden
Companies based in Stockholm